Sir Thomas Warner (1580 – 10 March 1649) was a captain in the guards of James I of England who became an explorer in the Caribbean. In 1620 he served at the brief-lived English settlement of Oyapoc in present-day Guyana of South America, which was abandoned the same year. The Dutch controlled most of the territory. Warner is noted for settling on Saint Kitts and establishing it in 1624 as the first English colony in the Caribbean.

Early life and education
Warner was born in Suffolk, England in 1580. He entered the army at an early age, which provided him with his main training.

He later married and started a family with his wife, which included their son Philip.  Thomas Warner had an Island Carib mistress on St. Kitts, and their son was called "Indian Warner".  Indian Warner was killed in the Dominica Massacre.

Military career
Warner became a captain in James I's guards. In 1620 he accepted assignment to the colonies, and took his family with him to the Oyapoc Colony in 1620 in today's Guyana. He served as a captain under the command of Roger North.

Tomas Painton, another captain in the colony, suggested that Warner should try to colonise one of the islands in the Lesser Antilles, which Painton thought had more favourable conditions. In 1623 Warner abandoned his Guiana post and set sail North through the archipelago. Oyapoc was soon abandoned by the English.

St Kitts

Early settlement
After checking each island, Warner decided that Saint Kitts would be the best-suited site for an English colony. He noted its strategic central position ideal for expansion, friendly native population, fertile soil, abundant fresh water, and large salt deposits. He and his family landed on the island and made peace with the local Kalinago people, whose leader was Ouboutou Tegremante. They were part of the indigenous Carib people of the islands.

Warner left his family on the island and returned to England to gather more men to officially establish a colony. He was supported by Ralph Merrifield, a merchant, who provided the capital, and the brothers John and Samuel Jeaffreson. The Jeaffresons agreed to bring a second vessel with settlers and supplies. Warner returned to St. Kitts on January 28, 1624, with the Hopewell and established the colony of Saint Christopher, the first English colony in the Caribbean. He established a port town at Old Road, downhill from Tegremante's capital village. Another name for St. Kitts is St.Christopher.

French arrival
In 1625, a French captain, Pierre Belain d'Esnambuc, arrived on the island. He had organized a fleet of colonists hoping to establish an island colony, after hearing about the success of the English on Saint Kitts, but his fleet was destroyed by a run-in with the Spanish Armada. Only his flagship and its passengers survived to reach St. Kitts. Feeling sorry for the French colonists, Warner allowed them to settle on the island. Saint Kitts was thus the site of the first French settlement in the Caribbean. They took the ruins of the town of Dieppe, which they rebuilt. Warner accepted the French to gain more Europeans on the island, as he thought the local Kalinago were becoming less enthusiastic about the newcomers.

Kalinago genocide
Warner's concerns proved accurate. As the European population on Saint Kitts continued to increase, Tegremante grew suspicious of the foreigners. In 1626, after a secret meeting with Kalinago heads from neighbouring Waitikubuli (Dominica) and Oualie, the natives decided to ambush the European settlements on the night of the next full moon. The plan was revealed to the Europeans by an Igneri woman named Barbe. She had recently been brought to St. Kitts as a slave-wife after the Kalinago raided an Arawak island. According to the French historian Jean-Baptiste Du Tertre, she despised the Kalinago and had fallen in love with Warner.

The English and French joined forces and attacked the Carib at night. The colonists killed between 100 and 120 Caribs in their beds that night, with only the most beautiful Carib women spared to serve as slaves. The French and English set about fortifying the island against the expected invasion of Carib from other islands.

According to Du Tertre, in the ensuing battle, three to four thousand Caribs took up arms against the Europeans. He did not estimate the number of Caribs killed, but said the fallen Amerindians on the beach were piled high into a mound. The English and French suffered at least 100 casualties. Others report that at Bloody Point, which then was the site of the island's main Kalinago settlement, over 2,000 Kalinago men were massacred. Many had come from Waitikubuli, planning to attack the Europeans the next day. The Europeans dumped the dead into the river, at the site of the Kalinago place of worship. For weeks, blood flowed down the river, for which it was named Bloody River. The Europeans deported the remaining Kalinago to Waitikubuli.

The early accounts were by Europeans and told from their point of view. Modern scientists and historians estimate that many of their claims were fraudulent or exaggerated in order to justify the killings.

Ethnologists have put the events into a different context. The killings occurred in late January, near the middle of the dry season. The Kalinago called this the season of "Bat man", due to the abundance of the species then. Usually, they made raids on the Taino and other Amerindians at this time to take sacrifices to appease "Bat man," to ensure the dry season ended and the wet season began. (This was called the season of "Frog woman".) Kalinago had gathered from various islands at St. Christopher at the time, because of its location: on the border between the islands controlled by different groups, it was used as a base for Kalinago raids against the Taino. Evidence of atrocity was that the Europeans killed so many and defiled the Kalinago place of worship, a means of frightening the Kalinago of neighbouring islands.

After the Kalinago Genocide of 1626, the Europeans partitioned the island, with the French gaining the ends, Capisterre in the North and Basseterre in the south; and the British gaining the centre. Both groups colonised neighbouring islands from their bases. The English settled Nevis (1628), Antigua (1632), and Montserrat (1632). Warner was appointed as Governor of St. Kitts, Nevis, Barbados and Montserrat in 1625.

The French colonised Martinique (1635), the Guadeloupe archipelago (1635), and St Barts (1648).

In 1643 Warner was appointed as Parliamentary Governor of the Caribee Islands. After his first wife died, he was said to have taken a Carib woman in a 'common-law marriage' and they had a lasting relationship. Warner died on March 10, 1649, in St. Kitts and was buried in a tomb in Middle Island. The Carib woman was reported to have given birth to many other children after Warner's death.

Slave trade
After the Kalinago Genocide of 1626 and the subsequent partitioning of the island, Warner imported many thousands of African slaves for labour. They were forced to develop and work on large sugar and tobacco plantations to raise commodity crops for export. As the years passed, Sir Thomas Warner amassed a wealth that would amount to over £100 million in today's terms. He died on March 10, 1649, in St. Kitts, and he was buried in a tomb in Middle Island.

See also
History of Saint Kitts and Nevis

References

External links
Interesting sites on Saint Kitts and Nevis, University
French St. Christophe, or English St.Kitts?
St. Kitts, settlement and governors, Ancestry UK
Sir Thomas Warner, BBC

1580 births
1649 deaths
English emigrants
History of British Saint Christopher and Nevis
Governors of British Saint Christopher
Governors of Antigua and Barbuda
Governors of Nevis
People from Saint Thomas Middle Island Parish
Thomas